Congenital stationary night blindness (CSNB) is a rare non-progressive retinal disorder. People with CSNB often have difficulty adapting to low light situations due to impaired photoreceptor transmission. These patients may also have reduced visual acuity, myopia, nystagmus, and strabismus. CSNB has two forms -- complete, also known as type-1 (CSNB1), and incomplete, also known as type-2 (CSNB2), which are distinguished by the involvement of different retinal pathways. In CSNB1, downstream neurons called  bipolar cells are unable to detect neurotransmission from photoreceptor cells. CSNB1 can be caused by mutations in various genes involved in neurotransmitter detection, including NYX. In CSNB2, the photoreceptors themselves have impaired neurotransmission function; this is caused primarily by mutations in the gene CACNA1F, which encodes a voltage-gated calcium channel important for neurotransmitter release. CSNB has been identified in horses and dogs as the result of mutations in  TRPM1 (Horse, "LP"), GRM6 (Horse, "CSNB2"), and LRIT3 (Dog, CSNB).

Congenital stationary night blindness (CSNB) can be inherited in an X-linked, autosomal dominant, or autosomal recessive pattern, depending on the genes involved.  

Two forms of CSNB can also affect horses, one linked to the leopard complex of equine coat colors and the other found in certain horse breeds. Both are autosomal recessives.

Symptoms and signs
The X-linked varieties of congenital stationary night blindness (CSNB) can be differentiated from the autosomal forms by the presence of myopia, which is typically absent in the autosomal forms. Patients with CSNB often have impaired night vision, myopia, reduced visual acuity, strabismus and nystagmus. Individuals with the complete form of CSNB (CSNB1) have highly impaired rod sensitivity (reduced ~300x) as well as cone dysfunction. Patients with the incomplete form can present with either myopia or hyperopia.

Cause
CSNB is caused by malfunctions in neurotransmission from rod and cone photoreceptors to  bipolar cells in the retina. At this first synapse, information from photoreceptors is divided into two channels: ON and OFF. The ON pathway detects light onset, while the OFF pathway detects light offset. The malfunctions in CSNB1 specifically affect the ON pathway, by hindering the ability of ON-type bipolar cells to detect neurotransmitter released from photoreceptors. Rods, which are responsible for low-light vision, make contacts with ON-type bipolar cells only, while, cones, which are responsible for bright-light vision, make contacts with bipolar cells of both ON an OFF subtypes.  Because the low-light sensing rods feed only into the ON pathway, individuals with CSNB1 typically have problems with night vision, while vision in well-lit conditions is spared. In CSNB2, release of neurotransmitter from photoreceptors is impaired, leading to involvement of both ON and OFF pathways.

The electroretinogram (ERG) is an important tool for diagnosing CSNB. The ERG a-wave, which reflects the function of the  phototransduction cascade in response to a light flashes, is typically normal in CSNB patients, although in some cases phototransduction is also affected, leading to a reduced a-wave. The ERG b-wave, which primarily reflects the function of ON-bipolar cells, is greatly reduced in CSNB2 cases, and completely absent in CSNB1 cases.

Genetics
Only three rhodopsin mutations have been found associated with congenital stationary night blindness (CSNB). Two of these mutations are found in the second transmembrane helix of rhodopsin at Gly-90 and Thr-94. Specifically, these mutations are the Gly90Asp  and the Thr94Ile, which has been the most recent one reported. The third mutation is Ala292Glu, and it is located in the seventh transmembrane helix, in proximity to the site of retinal attachment at Lys-296. Mutations associated with CSNB affect amino acid residues near the protonated Schiff base (PSB) linkage. They are associated with changes in conformational stability and the protonated status of the PSB nitrogen.

Pathophysiology

CSNB1
The complete form of X-linked congenital stationary night blindness, also known as nyctalopia, is caused by mutations in the NYX gene (Nyctalopin on X-chromosome), which encodes a small leucine-rich repeat (LRR) family protein of unknown function. This protein consists of an N-terminal signal peptide and 11 LRRs (LRR1-11) flanked by cysteine-rich LRRs (LRRNT and LRRCT). At the C-terminus of the protein there is a putative GPI anchor site. Although the function of NYX is yet to be fully understood, it is believed to be located extracellularly. A naturally occurring deletion of 85 bases in NYX in some mice leads to the "nob" (no b-wave) phenotype, which is highly similar to that seen in CSNB1 patients. NYX is expressed primarily in the rod and cone cells of the retina. There are currently almost 40 known mutations in NYX associated with CSNB1, Table 1., located throughout the protein. As the function of the nyctalopin protein is unknown, these mutations have not been further characterized. However, many of them are predicted to lead to truncated proteins that, presumably, are non-functional.

CSNB2

The incomplete form of X-linked congenital stationary night blindness (CSNB2) is caused by mutations in the CACNA1F gene, which encodes the voltage-gated calcium channel CaV1.4 expressed heavily in retina. One of the important properties of this channel is that it inactivates at an extremely low rate. This allows it to produce sustained Ca2+ entry upon depolarization. As photoreceptors  depolarize in the absence of light, CaV1.4 channels operate to provide sustained neurotransmitter release upon depolarization. This has been demonstrated in CACNA1F mutant mice that have markedly reduced photoreceptor calcium signals. There are currently 55 mutations in CACNA1F located throughout the channel, Table 2 and Figure 1. While most of these mutations result in truncated and, likely, non-functional channels, it is expected that they prevent the ability of light to hyperpolarize photoreceptors. Of the mutations with known functional consequences, 4 produce channels that are either completely non-functional, and two that result in channels which open at far more hyperpolarized potentials than wild-type. This will result in photoreceptors that continue to release neurotransmitter even after light-induced hyperpolarization.

Diagnosis

Footnotes

External links 

  GeneReview/NCBI/NIH/UW entry on X-Linked Congenital Stationary Night Blindness

Channelopathies
Eye diseases